Robert Jolin Osborne (May 3, 1932 – March 6, 2017) was an American film historian, television presenter, author, actor and the primary host for more than 20 years of the cable channel Turner Classic Movies (TCM). Prior to hosting at TCM, Osborne had been a host on The Movie Channel, and earlier, a columnist for The Hollywood Reporter. Osborne wrote the official history of the Academy Awards, originally published in 1988.

Early life
Osborne was born on May 3, 1932, in Colfax, Washington, where he was reared. His parents were Robert Eugene Osborne, a public school teacher, and Hazel Ida (née Jolin). Osborne graduated from the University of Washington School of Journalism in 1954.

After graduation, Osborne served two years in the U.S. Air Force, and was stationed in Seattle where he acted in local theater in his spare time. At the suggestion of Oscar-winning actress Jane Darwell, with whom he appeared in a play, he headed to Hollywood after completing his military service in the late 1950s.

Career

Actor
Osborne began his career working as a contract actor for Desi Arnaz and Lucille Ball's Desilu Studios. There, Osborne became part of Lucille Ball's Desilu Workshop, in which Ball worked with and nurtured such young performers as Osborne and actress-singer Carole Cook.

One of Osborne's early television appearances was in a 1959 episode of Westinghouse Desilu Playhouse called "Chain of Command", starring Hugh O'Brian. He was also featured in the Christmas Day Desilu Playhouse installment "The Desilu Revue" in December 1959. He also had small roles in such TV shows as The Californians and the 1962 pilot episode of The Beverly Hillbillies, "The Clampetts Strike Oil" (in the role of Jeff Taylor). He refrained from signing on for the series, however, thinking the show would not be a success, and instead concentrated on acting in television commercials.

Ball suggested that Osborne focus his energies on becoming a journalist; Osborne would often quip, "especially after she saw me act". After The Beverly Hillbillies, Osborne worked on writing and journalism. In 1965, Osborne had his first book published, Academy Awards Illustrated.

Columnist
In 1977, Osborne began a long-standing stint as a columnist for The Hollywood Reporter. The following year, he published 50 Golden Years of Oscar, which won the 1979 National Film Book award. Having joined the Los Angeles Film Critics Association, he was elected its president in 1981, and served as such till 1983. In 1982, Osborne began a five-year stint as the entertainment reporter on KTTV Channel 11 in Los Angeles. In addition, he began his Rambling Reporter column for The Hollywood Reporter, published five times weekly.

In 1984, Osborne began hosting for The Movie Channel, as well as winning the Publicists Guild of America 1984 Press Award. The following year, he began a relationship with Academy of Motion Picture Arts and Sciences (AMPAS), when he hosted a tribute to Shirley Temple at the Academy's Samuel Goldwyn Theatre in Beverly Hills. In 1988, AMPAS commissioned him to write 60 Years of the Oscar; he later wrote five updates to the volume, the latest being 85 Years of the Oscar in 2013.

Turner Classic Movies

In 1994, Ted Turner created Turner Classic Movies as a competitor to American Movie Classics (now known as AMC). Osborne was selected as the host of their nightly broadcasts. For TCM, in addition to hosting four primetime movies seven days a week, he was also the host of special one-on-one "Private Screening" interviews featuring many familiar actors and directors. Beginning in 2006, Osborne also co-hosted TCM's The Essentials. His co-hosts were Molly Haskell from 2006 to 2007, Carrie Fisher from 2007 to 2008, Rose McGowan from 2008 to 2009, Alec Baldwin from 2009 to 2011, Drew Barrymore and finally Sally Field.

Osborne also participated in events at the Paley Center for Media in New York City saluting the television careers of Lucille Ball and Cloris Leachman.

From 2005 to 2010, Osborne hosted the annual "Robert Osborne's Classic Film Festival" in Athens, Georgia. The nonprofit event was held by the University of Georgia's Grady College of Journalism and Mass Communication.

In 2010, Osborne hosted the first TCM Classic Film Festival, and participated in subsequent annual festivals.

In 2011, Osborne became ill and TCM announced that Osborne would be taking "a short break from his TCM hosting duties for minor surgery, followed by a vacation." Osborne continued to appear on Saturday nights, hosting The Essentials with Alec Baldwin. In 2012, Osborne began to share some of his hosting duties with Ben Mankiewicz. Mankiewicz hosted primetime films two nights a week, as well as many daytime events. Osborne stated that he would continue to work "as long as I have health, and as long as I think I look O.K. on camera." He also said, "If I really couldn't do it with enthusiasm, that would be the time to quit."

In 2013, Osborne presented the Honorary Academy Award to Dame Angela Lansbury at the Fifth Governors Awards. Osborne introduced Lansbury by saying he thought it was "one of the best decisions the Academy has ever made". In Lansbury's acceptance speech, she made it known that she chose Osborne to present the Oscar to her, stating, "the one person who really knew about my early work was Robert Osborne". She also thanked Osborne and TCM, saying, "Thanks to Turner Classic Movies and Robert, those great films are shown and studied and discussed by students everywhere, as well as seen by a huge general audience, so thank you TCM and thank you Robert for keeping me alive all these years."

In 2014, as part of an exclusive programming deal with Disney, TCM agreed to become the sponsor of The Great Movie Ride. The attraction underwent a refurbishment in 2015, with the addition of a new preshow and postshow hosted by Osborne, who also provides onboard narration to the ride. The changes were unveiled on May 29, 2015.

Death
Osborne retired in early 2016 due to ill health and missed a number of TCM annual events over the next year. He died from natural causes at his New York City apartment in The Osborne on West 57th Street on March 6, 2017, at the age of 84.

Reactions to his death included tributes from many in the entertainment industry. The Academy of Motion Pictures Arts and Sciences released a statement saying, "The affection he had for the Oscars and the Academy was wholeheartedly reciprocated, and we are grateful for his friendship and indelible contribution to film history and our community." Others in the industry who mourned Osborne included Alec Baldwin, Eva Marie Saint, Liza Minnelli, Cher, Larry King, Leonard Maltin, Patricia Arquette, Bryan Cranston, and Patton Oswalt.

On the day of Osborne's death, The Hollywood Reporter published a statement by Dame Angela Lansbury: "He was also the ultimate fan — and the ultimate friend — and our friendship will endure in my memory always".

Personal life
Osborne moved to New York City in the late 1980s. During his lifetime, few details of his personal life were reported, but upon his death he was confirmed to have been in a 20-year relationship with David Staller, a New York City theater producer and director.

Favorite films 
In an interview in 2009, with the Screen Actors Guild Foundation, Osborne stated his favorite films included:

A Place in the Sun (1951)
All About Eve (1950)
The Third Man (1949)
Sunset Boulevard (1950)
Singin’ in the Rain (1952)
Rebecca (1940)
Random Harvest (1942)
Red River (1948)
Stagecoach (1939)
The Razor's Edge (1946)
This is Spinal Tap (1984)

Osborne also mentioned modern films he loved such as Martin Scorsese's The Age of Innocence (1993), and The Departed (2006), as well as Christopher Guest's Best in Show (2000).

Filmography

Awards and honors
Osborne won the Publicists Guild of America 1984 Press Award. He also received an honorary doctorate from the Academy of Art University in 2005, and was awarded a star at Vine Street on the Hollywood Walk of Fame in 2006. In 2007, he received the National Board of Review's William K. Everson Award.

In January 2016, Osborne was given the inaugural William Cameron Menzies Award from the Art Directors Guild, recognizing his 35 years as a film historian, columnist, and critic championing visual entertainment.

In March 2018, Turner Classic Movies announced the establishment of the Robert Osborne Award, to be presented at the annual TCM Classic Film Festival "to an individual whose work has helped keep the cultural heritage of classic films alive and thriving for generations to come." The inaugural recipient was film director Martin Scorsese for his work with The Film Foundation, which Scorsese helped found in 1990.

The Academy of Motion Pictures Arts and Sciences honored Osborne by including him in their In Memoriam montage during the Oscars telecast.

The Robert Osborne Award 
In 2018, the TCM Film Festival created the Robert Osborne Award.

The winners included:
2018: Martin Scorsese
2019: Kevin Brownlow
2020: Leonard Maltin

The Robert Osborne Collection 
In 2021, the American Film Institute launched the Robert Osborne Collection. The online collection features a variety of Osborne’s famous film introductions on AFI.com.

In popular culture 
Osborne made several cameo appearances as himself including on the Cartoon Network animated series Harvey Birdman, Attorney at Law where he introduced the 2005 episode "Turner Classic Birdman". Osborne also made a cameo appearance in the Netflix comedy series Unbreakable Kimmy Schmidt episode "Kimmy's in a Love Triangle!" introducing the fiction 1938 film "Daddy's Boy!" on Turner Classic Movies.

Osborne was also spoofed on Saturday Night Live with Darrell Hammond portraying him in 2006 and Jason Sudeikis playing him in recurring sketches from 2010 to 2012.

Bibliography
Books
 
 
 
 
 
 
 
 
 
 
 
 
 
 

Forewords
 
 
 
 
 
 Arnold, Jeremy (2016). The Essentials: 52 Must-See Movies and Why They Matter. Foreword by Robert Osborne. Running Press. .

References
Notes

External links

 Official website
 
 
 Robert Osborne's column in The Hollywood Reporter (2009)
  Turner Classic Movies biography.
 The Robert Osborne Collection
 Cinema Retro interview with Robert Osborne
 Gilbert Gottfried's Amazing Colossal Podcast long-form interview with Robert Osborne, July, 2014

1932 births
2017 deaths
20th-century American biographers
20th-century American male actors
21st-century American biographers
21st-century American male actors
American columnists
American film historians
American gay actors
American gay writers
American magazine writers
American male film actors
American male non-fiction writers
American male television actors
American television hosts
Film theorists
Journalists from New York City
Journalists from Washington (state)
American LGBT broadcasters
American LGBT journalists
LGBT people from Washington (state)
Male actors from New York City
Male actors from Washington (state)
Military personnel from Washington (state)
People from Colfax, Washington
The Hollywood Reporter people
United States Air Force airmen
University of Washington College of Arts and Sciences alumni
Writers from Manhattan
Writers from Washington (state)